The Yaz-class small artillery craft, also known as Project 1208, is a Russian Coast Guard patrol craft. This gunboat is designed to operate in rivers to secure and protect Russian maritime borders, enforce navigational laws and other law enforcement duties, and search and rescue. The single active vessel is assigned to the Amur-Ussuri River network.

Design
The patrol craft have a basic design and are powered by diesel engines. The weapon suite allows the craft to engage surface, ground, and air threats and targets. The gunboats have cutaway bows to allow for improved navigation through ice. The vessels are constructed with extensive armor.

See also
List of ships of Russia by project number

References

Patrol vessels of Russia
Patrol boat classes
Gunboat classes